Joseph Martin McCabe (12 November 1867 – 10 January 1955) was an English writer and speaker on freethought, after having been a Roman Catholic priest earlier in his life. He was "one of the great mouthpieces of freethought in England". Becoming a critic of the Catholic Church, McCabe joined groups such as the Rationalist Association and the National Secular Society. He criticised Christianity from a rationalist perspective, but also was involved in the South Place Ethical Society which grew out of dissenting Protestantism and was a precursor of modern secular humanism.

Early life
McCabe was born in Macclesfield in Cheshire to a family of Irish Catholic background, but his family moved to Manchester while he was still a child. He entered the Franciscan order at the age of 15, and spent a year of preliminary study at Gorton Monastery. His novitiate year took place in Killarney, after which he was transferred to Forest Gate in London (to the school which is now St Bonaventure's Catholic School) for the remainder of his priestly education. In 1890 he was ordained into the priesthood with the name Father Antony.

He was recognised as an outstanding scholar of philosophy, and was sent for a year (1893–1894) to study at the Catholic University of Louvain. Here he was successfully taught Hebrew by Albin van Hoonacker, and, less successfully, Syriac by T. J. Lamy. He also studied under, and befriended, Mercier. He returned to London and resumed priestly and educational duties, until in October 1895 when he was put in charge of the newly founded Franciscan college in Buckingham, (which is now St Bernardine's Catholic Church, Buckingham). He had gradually been losing his faith and eventually left that post and the priesthood in February 1896.

Writing career
Shortly after leaving the priesthood, McCabe began writing. He wrote a pamphlet on his experiences, From Rome to Rationalism, published in 1897, which he then expanded to book length as Twelve Years in a Monastery (1897). William Ferguson wrote of him: "He was bitterly anti-Catholic but also actively undermined religious faith in general." From 1898 to 1899 he was secretary of the Leicester Secular Society, and he was a founding board member in 1899 of the Rationalist Press Association of Great Britain. He wrote prolifically on science, religion, politics, history and culture, writing nearly 250 books during his life. Many of his books and pamphlets were published by E. Haldeman-Julius, both as Little Blue Books and Big Blue Books. Over 100 Big Blue Books by McCabe were published.

McCabe was also respected as a speaker, and gave several thousand lectures in his lifetime.

McCabe was also an advocate of women's rights and worked with Mrs. Pankhurst and Mrs. Wolstenholme-Elmy on speeches favoring giving British women the right to vote.

McCabe is also known for his inclusion in G. K. Chesterton's book Heretics. In a previous essay he took Chesterton to task for including humor in his serious writings. By doing so, he allowed Chesterton to make the quip "Mr. McCabe thinks that I am not serious but only funny, because Mr. McCabe thinks that funny is the opposite of serious. Funny is the opposite of not funny, and of nothing else."

McCabe was also active in organizations, although his biographer notes that he had a difficult relationship with some of their leading figures, and consequently relations between McCabe and various groups could also be strained. He was an Appointed Lecturer at the South Place Ethical Society, where he could still occasionally be heard after 1934. McCabe's freethought stance grew more militant as he got older, and he joined the National Secular Society in the year before he died.

Evolution

In 1900 McCabe translated the book Riddle of the Universe by Ernst Haeckel. He also wrote a number of works on evolution.
McCabe was also involved with the Rationalist Association and in 1925 they arranged for him to debate the early Canadian young earth
creationist George McCready Price.

Religion

In his essays The Myth of the Resurrection (1925) and Did Jesus Ever Live? (1926) McCabe wrote that Christianity is a direct representation of older Pagan beliefs. Slain saviors and their resurrection myths were currently known and celebrated across the ancient world before Christianity began. According to McCabe the Gospel accounts of the Resurrection of Jesus contain numerous conflicts, contradictions and errors and are unreliable as they had been fabricated over the years by many different writers. McCabe came to the conclusion that Jesus was an Essenian holy man who was turned into a God over the years by hearsay and oral tradition.

In about 1947, McCabe accused the Encyclopædia Britannica of bias towards the Catholic Church. He claimed that the 14th edition, which had been published in 1929, was devoid of the critical comment about the church that had been in the 11th edition. McCabe similarly accused the Columbia Encyclopedia of bias towards the Catholic Church in 1951. These and similar actions have made him be termed a "Catholic basher" by his Christian critics. Biographer Bill Cooke, however, disputes the allegation, citing McCabe's opinion that "Catholics are no worse, and no better, than others", and "I have not the least prejudice against the Catholic laity, which would be stupid."

Spiritualism

In 1920 McCabe publicly debated the Spiritualist Arthur Conan Doyle on the claims of Spiritualism at Queen's Hall in London. McCabe later published his evidence against Spiritualism in a booklet entitled Is Spiritualism Based on Fraud?. McCabe had exposed the tricks of fraud mediums and wrote that Spiritualism has no scientific basis. His article Scientific Men and Spiritualism is a skeptical analysis of the subject and a look at how various scientists such as William Crookes and Cesare Lombroso had been duped into believing Spiritualism by mediumship tricks. He also wrote the book Spiritualism: A Popular History from 1847.

Works
The 'Big Blue Books': (a selection of titles available online)
 The Vatican's Last Crime
 How the Pope Of Peace Traded In Blood
 How the Cross Courted The Swastika For Eight Years
 The Vatican Buries International Law
 Hitler Dupes The Vatican
 Treitschke and the Great War
 The War And Papal Intrigue
 The Pious Traitors Of Belgium And France
 The Pope And The Italian Jackal
 Atheist Russia Shakes The World
 Fascist Romanism Defies Civilization
 The Totalitarian Church Of Rome
 The Tyranny Of The Clerical Gestapo
 Rome Puts A Blight On Culture
 The Church The Enemy Of The Workers
 The Church Defies Modern Life
 The Holy Faith Of Romanists
 How the Faith Is Protected
 The Artistic Sterility Of The Church
 The Fruits Of Romanism

Some Other Works:
 Twelve Years in a Monastery, Smith, Elder & Co (1897)
 
 The Religion of Woman: an Historical Study, Watts & Co., introduction by Lady Florence Dixie
 
 
 
 
 
 
 
 
 
 
 
  See List of names in A Biographical Dictionary of Modern Rationalists
 
 
 
 
 
 
 
 
 
 
 
 
 
 
 
 
  (Note that online sources often erroneously date this work to 1920, confusing it with his Biographical Dictionary of Modern Rationalists.)
 
 
 
 
 
 
 
 
 Luther Burbank Speaks Out

See also
 List of names in A Biographical Dictionary of Modern Rationalists

References

Bibliography
 Cooke, Bill (2001). A Rebel to His Last Breath: Joseph McCabe and Rationalism. Prometheus Books.

External links

 
 
 
 Checklist of the Little Blue Books – lists little blue books including Joseph McCabe's, not listed in the "Works" section of this article.

English atheists
English sceptics
British atheism activists
Critics of Christianity
Critics of parapsychology
Critics of Theosophy
Critics of the Catholic Church
Former Roman Catholics
Freethought writers
Rationalists
English non-fiction writers
1867 births
1955 deaths
People from Macclesfield
English male non-fiction writers
People educated at St Bonaventure's Catholic School
19th-century atheists
20th-century atheists
Writers about religion and science
Critics of Spiritualism